Episomus figuratus is a species of weevil found in Sri Lanka.

Description
This species has a body length is about 11.5 to 16 mm. Body black, where the dorsum covered with dense light or dark brown scales variegated with pale spots. Margins of the thorax and elytra with pale blue, or greenish, or whitish scales. Head with a broad central furrows. Rostrum broad, and roundly dilated towards apex. Scutellum small. Elytra elongate, ovate, with sharply acuminate apex. Legs densely covered with greenish or grey scales. In tibiae, there is a darker median patch.

References 

Curculionidae
Insects of Sri Lanka
Beetles described in 1882